The 5 cm leichter Granatwerfer 36  (5 cm leGrW 36) was a light mortar used by Nazi Germany during World War II.

History
The mortar's development was started in 1934 by Rheinmetall-Borsig AG and it was adopted for service in 1936. Its intended role was to engage pockets of resistance that were beyond a hand grenade's throwing range. Until 1938, it used a complicated telescopic sight. By 1941, the Granatwerfer 36 was seen as too complex for its intended role. It fired too light a shell and had too short of a range. It was used as a platoon mortar and operated by a 3-man team. Production was terminated in 1941. By 1942, it had been gradually withdrawn from front line service. However, it remained in use with second-line and garrison units until the end of the Second World War in 1945. As ammunition stocks for the mortar dwindled during 1944-1945, coupled with the loss of the actual mortars, the Germans often relied on captured French and Soviet 50 mm mortars. The 50 mm continued to be popular for the remainder of the war, simply because it was easily transported by two men, and provided infantry with hitting power and a range capability greater than any other weapon readily available at the squad or section level. A total of 22,112,000 rounds of ammunition were produced for the weapon from 1939 to 1943.

External links
German 5cm Leichte Granatwerfer 36
Lone Sentry:50-mm Light Mortar, German

References 
 Gander, Terry and Chamberlain, Peter. Weapons of the Third Reich: An Encyclopedic Survey of All Small Arms, Artillery and Special Weapons of the German Land Forces 1939-1945. New York: Doubleday, 1979 

World War II infantry mortars of Germany
50 mm artillery
Rheinmetall
Military equipment introduced in the 1930s